U.S. Highway 87 (US 87) is a north-south United States Numbered Highway in the state of Montana.

Route description
The three routes continue westward for another  to Billings, where it intersects with the western terminus of I-94 in suburban Lockwood. US 87 follows the I-90/US 212 concurrency for another  before it heads north, following Main Street through Billings Heights. US 87 continues north with a slight bend to the northwest for  until it intersects Montana State Highway 200 (MT 200) near Grass Range and takes a sharp turn west; US 87 remains concurrent with MT 200 until Great Falls.

History
US 87 originally ran northwest out of Great Falls towards the eastern border of Glacier National Park to the Canadian Border at the Piegan Border Crossing. This was changed in 1934, when US 89 was diverted to US 87's routing north of Great Falls. US 87 ended in Great Falls until  when it was extended to its current northern terminus near Havre.

Major intersections

Special routes
The following are special routes of U.S. Route 87 in Montana.

Great Falls

U.S. Highway 87 Bypass (US 87 Byp.) exists on the eastern and northern edge of Great Falls. The route begins at 10th Avenue South (US 87/US 89/MT 3/MT 200) west of Malmstrom Air Force Base along 57th Street South and runs south to north. Just south of the intersection with 2nd Avenue North the name of the road changes to 57th Street North. At 10th Avenue North, the street name changes to River Drive North, then curves towards the west as it crosses a bridge over a former Milwaukee Road railroad line. The route heads straight west until after the intersection of North Park Trail where it curves to the northwest. After a railroad crossing and the entrance to Giant Springs State Park and the Lewis and Clark Interpretive Center, the road curves to the southwest, generally following the south bank of the Missouri River. US 87 Byp. ends at US 87 south of the 15th Street Bridge, but River Drive North continues along the Missouri River through Riverside Park. It is known internally by Montana Department of Transportation as Corridor N-102 (C005205).

Lewistown

U.S. Highway 87 Bypass (US 87 Byp.) in Lewistown, also known as the Truck Bypass, is an unsigned highway follows the northern and western edge of the city. The route begins at Main Street (US 87/MT 200), just east of downtown, and follows 1st Avenue North to Kendall Road (US 191 north), where the roadway turns westward becoming 6th Avenue North and also becomes part of US 191. Just west of Lewistown, the roadway turns southwest and re-joins US 87/MT 200. US 87 Byp. is unsigned as the majority of the route is signed as part of US 191. It is known internally by Montana Department of Transportation as part of Corridor N-43 (C000043) and N-75 (C000075).

See also

References

External links

 Montana
87
Transportation in Big Horn County, Montana
Transportation in Yellowstone County, Montana
Transportation in Musselshell County, Montana
Transportation in Petroleum County, Montana
Transportation in Fergus County, Montana
Transportation in Judith Basin County, Montana
Transportation in Cascade County, Montana
Transportation in Chouteau County, Montana
Transportation in Hill County, Montana